Hiram Keller (May 3, 1944 – January 20, 1997), born Hiram Keller Undercofler Jr., was an American stage and film actor who starred in European films. He is best known for his role as Ascyltus in Federico Fellini's 1969 film Satyricon.

Broadway 
Keller was the son of the Chief Justice of the Supreme Court of the State of Georgia (USA). He received his dramatic training at Lee Strasberg's Actors Studio in New York. His first stage engagement took him to Broadway. Keller was a close friend of actress Monique Van Vooren. When she invested in the original production of Hair, she asked producer Michael Butler to put Keller in the cast. From 1968 until his departure to appear in Satyricon, he was a member of "the tribe" in the original line-up stage production of Hair, directed by Tom O'Horgan, written by Gerome Ragni and James Rado, music by Galt MacDermot. Keller also worked as a runway and print model for 14 years and acted in the New York underground scene with Andy Warhol.

Film 
Two years later, Keller was in Satyricon, his feature film debut. The Italian director Federico Fellini hired him for the leading role in his surreal adaptation of the surviving portions of Gaius Petronius's work of fiction Satyricon, when Pierre Clémenti, his preferred candidate for the role of Ascyltus, was no longer available. This role boosted Keller's career internationally. Fellini's long-time employee and screenwriter Bernardino Zapponi wrote of Keller's representation:
"[He] has a very photogenic smile and is full of knowledge as required by his role."

After this success, Keller received major roles in European productions. He had the leading role in the Greek motion picture Orestis (1969), in 1970 he appeared with John Phillip Law in Strogoff, an Italian-French-German-Bulgarian co-production based on Jules Verne's Michel Strogoff; two years later, he starred with Giancarlo Giannini in Alberto Lattuada's comedy Sono stato io! and had the male lead role opposite Jane Birkin in the Antonio Margheriti-directed horror movie Seven Deaths in the Cat's Eye; in 1975, he had the main role in the science fiction thriller Lifespan, with Tina Aumont and Klaus Kinski, followed by Catherine Breillat's A Real Young Girl (1976). He appeared in 1974 in two productions for Italian television, Miklós Jancsó's historical drama Roma rivoule Cesare and in the series Orlando furioso, based on Ludovico Ariosto's epic poem.

In 1982, Keller starred with his wife Kristina St. Clair in the cult Jamaican production Countryman, his last film.

Personal life and death 
Keller was married to actress Kristina St. Clair from 1981 to 1987 and had a daughter named Serena Keller Undercofler, who works in the film industry as music supervisor. His last years were spent with his family in his native homeland in Atlanta, Georgia. He died there on January 20, 1997 of liver cancer at age 52. During the production of Hair, Keller was exposed to hepatitis C, which is linked to liver cancer.

Filmography 
 1969 Fellini Satyricon
 1969 Orestis
 1970 Ciao, Federico!
 1970 Strogoff (The Courier of the Czar)
 1972 La notte dei fiori
 1972 Grazie signore p...
 1972 Il sorriso della iena
 1972 Rosina Fumo viene in città... per farsi il corredo 
 1973 Sono stato io
 1973 Seven Deaths in the Cat's Eye
 1974 Roma rivuole Cesare (for TV)
 1974 Orlando furioso (for TV)
 1974 Noa Noa
 1975 Lifespan
 1976 A Real Young Girl
 1982 Countryman

References

External links
 
 
 
 
 

1944 births
1997 deaths
Deaths from liver cancer
American male film actors
20th-century American male actors